Christopher Magnus Howard "Kit" Pedler (11 June 1927 – 27 May 1981) was a British medical scientist, parapsychologist and science fiction author.

Biography

He was the head of the electron microscopy department at the Institute of Ophthalmology, University of London, where he published a number of papers. Pedler's first television contribution was for the BBC programme Tomorrow's World.

In the mid-1960s, Pedler became the unofficial scientific adviser to the Doctor Who production team. Hired by Innes Lloyd to inject more hard science into the stories, Pedler formed a particular writing partnership with Gerry Davis, the programme's story editor. Their interest in the problems of science changing and endangering human life led them to create the Cybermen.

Pedler wrote three scripts for Doctor Who: The Tenth Planet (with Gerry Davis), The Moonbase and The Tomb of the Cybermen (also with Gerry Davis). He also submitted the story outlines that became The War Machines, The Wheel in Space and The Invasion.

Pedler and Davis devised and co-wrote Doomwatch, a British science fiction television programme produced by the BBC. The programme which ran on BBC One for three seasons from 1970 to 1972 (37 50-minute episodes plus one unshown) covered a government department that worked to combat technological and environmental disasters. Pedler and Davis contributed to only the first two series.

Pedler and Davis re-used the plot of the first episode of the series, The Plastic Eaters, for their 1971 novel Mutant 59: The Plastic Eater.

His non-fiction book The Quest for Gaia gave practical advice on creating an ecologically sustainable lifestyle, using James Lovelock's Gaia hypothesis.

He died of a heart attack at his home in Doddington, Kent, while completing production of Mind Over Matter, a series for Thames Television on the paranormal that he presented with Tony Bastable.

Pedler is buried at All Saints Church in the Kent village of Graveney, where he lived before moving to nearby Doddington.

One of his daughters is the novelist Carol Topolski,  while the other, Lucy, is an ecological architect who practices sustainable design.  Interviews with his daughters can be found on the commentary track of episode one of the BBC Doctor Who DVD release of 'The Moonbase.'

His epitaph reads: "A man of ideas."

Parapsychology

Pedler was the author of Mind Over Matter (1981) which was based on the television series. The book argued for psychic phenomena such as psychokinesis and remote viewing. He also wrote there may be evidence for an "intelligent and massively ordered design" in the universe. The book was criticized for making incorrect statements about science. The science writer Georgina Ferry in a review wrote that the book and television series contained errors, lacked objectivity and is "not good science, neither is it good television".

Writing credits

Bibliography
Mutant 59: The Plastic Eaters (1971) (with Gerry Davis)
Brainrack (1974) (with Gerry Davis)
Doomwatch: The World in Danger (1975)
The Dynostar Menace (1975) (with Gerry Davis)
The Quest for Gaia (1979)
Mind Over Matter: A Scientist's View of the Paranormal (1981)

References

External links

  List of abstracts of scientific papers written by Dr Pedler
 

1927 births
1981 deaths
Alumni of the University of London
British science fiction writers
British science writers
British television writers
English writers on paranormal topics
Parapsychologists
20th-century English novelists
English male novelists
20th-century English male writers
People from Doddington, Kent
20th-century screenwriters